The Anti-Evolution League of America was a biblical creationist organization created in 1924 a year after William Bell Riley founded the Anti-Evolution League of Minnesota.  The first president was the Kentucky preacher Dr. J. W. Porter and T. T. Martin of Mississippi was field secretary and editor of the organization's official organ, The Conflict. The organization was behind anti-evolution legislation in Kentucky, where its efforts were supported by William Jennings Bryan. Following Bryan's death after the Scopes Trial, his son, William Jennings Bryan, Jr., briefly accepted the presidency of the league.

References

Creationist organizations
Organizations established in 1924
1924 establishments in the United States